Laila Bjurling (born 1947) is a Swedish social democratic politician who has been a member of the Riksdag since 1995.

External links
Laila Bjurling at the Riksdag website

1947 births
Living people
Members of the Riksdag from the Social Democrats
Women members of the Riksdag
Members of the Riksdag 2002–2006
21st-century Swedish women politicians
Members of the Riksdag 2006–2010